Criticom is a 3D fighting video game developed by Kronos Digital Entertainment and originally released in November 1995 in the USA, March 1996 in Europe and October in Japan by Vic Tokai for the PlayStation. The Sega Saturn version was released in early 1997.

Gameplay
The fighting action takes place on a round, elevated platform. Each fighter begins the fight with a full power meter and one power meter refill in reserve that is activated when the primary meter is depleted. There are no rounds. The fight runs until one fighter is knocked out (no more power in their meter), one is knocked out of the arena (or steps/jumps out), or the time runs out. As the game progresses, the player gains access to two additional "levels" for the character, which unlocks new moves and gives the character a new appearance.

Plot
Two alien races, the Nezom and Zerai clans obtained a powerful crystalline stone called "The Relic", and anointed themselves "The Chosen Ones". The Chosen Ones used this power to subjugate the other races, exterminating those that failed to comply. After this era of war, The Chosen Ones began to enjoy a new age of peace. However, The Relic was stolen and The Chosen Ones' power was shaken. Now, warriors from all over the universe seek the relic, each with their own ambitions.

Development
Criticom initially had a comic book character license and Sony Computer Entertainment as its publisher. As the game neared the end of the design phase, Sony took the license from Kronos Digital Entertainment and give it to one of their European subsidiaries. Rather than completely abandon their design work, Kronos opted to create new characters and shop the game concept to other publishers. Kronos president Stan Liu recounted:

Reception

The first news and screenshots of the game sparked an enthusiastic reaction from VideoGames, which called it "one of the coolest fighting game experiences in a long time", but ultimately went on to receive mostly negative reviews, as critics found the strong character designs and graphics to be outweighed by the poor animation and gameplay.

Reviewing the PlayStation version in GamePro, Scary Larry praised the game's interesting characters, "gorgeous" backgrounds, and sound effects. However, he felt the sluggish moves, particularly the throws, give the game less impact and make it more of a holdover until the next installment of Virtua Fighter or Toshinden. A reviewer for Next Generation said the game has impressive graphics, making particular note of the realistic lighting and shadow effects, but looks poor in motion due to the animation being done "by hand", without motion capture. While he found the character designs to be consistently "clever and imaginative", he deemed the game an overall failure due to the way the choppy frame rate interferes with the gameplay. Rich Leadbetter of Maximum remarked that the game has excellent graphics but poor animation and unexciting moves, and compared it unfavorably to Zero Divide and Tekken 2. PlayStation Magazine called it "a challenging combat game that only reveals its depth with time".

GamePro named the Saturn version the worst fighting game of the year, stating that compared to the PlayStation version of the previous season, it has "even slower gameplay, choppy, simple graphics, and no chance at being any fun."

According to Kronos president Stan Liu, the game was a commercial success, partly because it had been completed on budget and on time, and partly because it sold in respectable numbers, which he attributed chiefly to it being a fairly early PlayStation game.

Sequel
Kronos Digital Entertainment's next fighting game, Dark Rift, was originally announced under the title "Criticom II", and includes the character Demonica from Criticom.

References

External links
Criticom at MobyGames

1995 video games
3D fighting games
Fighting games
Multiplayer video games
PlayStation (console) games
Science fiction video games
Sega Saturn games
Vic Tokai games
Video games developed in the United States